Steven Nicholas Surry (born 11 February 1982) is an English professional golfer.

Surry was born in Bath, Somerset and turned professional in 2003. In his early career he competed mostly on the regional Jamega Tour, where he won nine events and headed the Order of Merit in 2006 and 2008. He is attached to Cumberwell Park Golf Club near Bradford on Avon, Wiltshire.

In 2009, Surry won the Michael Ward UK Open on the PGA EuroPro Tour on his way to 4th place on the Order of Merit, earning him a place on the second tier Challenge Tour for 2010. He also qualified to play in the 2009 Open Championship, where he missed the cut.

Surry gained his Tour Card for the South Africa-based Sunshine Tour in 2011. He now splits his playing schedule between the Sunshine Tour, and returning to Great Britain for some EuroPro events during the African winter period.

Professional wins (18)

Sunshine Tour wins (1)

Sunshine Tour playoff record (0–1)

PGA EuroPro Tour wins (1)

Jamega Pro Golf Tour wins (15)
2004–2008 9 victories
2011 Cumberwell Park
2012 Cumberwell Park 1, Heythrop Park, Cumberwell Park 2
2013 The Vale of Glamorgan
2017 Royal Ascot

Clutch Pro Tour wins (1)

Results in major championships

Note: Surry only played in The Open Championship.
CUT = missed the half-way cut

References

External links

English male golfers
European Tour golfers
Sportspeople from Bath, Somerset
People from Trowbridge
1982 births
Living people